
Pszczyna County is a unit of territorial administration and local government (powiat) in Silesian Voivodeship, southern Poland. It came into being on January 1, 1999, as a result of the Polish local government reforms passed in 1998.

As of 2019 its total population is 111,324, out of which the population of Pszczyna is 25,823 and the rural population is 85,501.

Neighbouring counties
Pszczyna County is bordered by Mikołów County, the city of Tychy and Bieruń-Lędziny County to the north, Oświęcim County to the east, Bielsko County to the south, Cieszyn County to the south-west, and the cities of Jastrzębie-Zdrój and Żory to the west.

Administrative division

The county is subdivided into six gminas (one urban-rural and five rural). These are listed in the following table, in descending order of population.

References

 
Pszczyna